Six Figures is a Canadian psychological thriller film, directed by David Christensen and released in 2005. An adaptation of the novel of the same name by Fred Leebron, the film stars JR Bourne as Warner Lutz, a man struggling with the stresses and frustrations of trying to maintain his upwardly mobile executive lifestyle who becomes the primary suspect when his wife Claire (Caroline Cave) is left comatose by a violent physical attack.

The film was Christensen's narrative feature debut following his prior work as a documentary filmmaker, and incorporated some documentary-style filmmaking techniques.

The film received a Genie Award nomination for Best Adapted Screenplay at the 26th Genie Awards, and was a finalist for the Rogers Best Canadian Film Award at the Toronto Film Critics Association Awards 2006.

References

External links

2005 films
English-language Canadian films
Canadian psychological thriller films
Films based on American novels
Films shot in Alberta
2000s English-language films
2000s Canadian films